The Burdigalian is, in the geologic timescale, an age or stage in the early Miocene. It spans the time  between 20.43 ± 0.05 Ma and 15.97 ± 0.05 Ma (million years ago). Preceded by the Aquitanian, the Burdigalian was the first and longest warming period of the Miocene and is succeeded by the Langhian.

Stratigraphic definition
The name Burdigalian comes from Burdigala, the Latin name for the city of Bordeaux, France. The Burdigalian Stage was introduced in scientific literature by Charles Depéret in 1892.

The base of the Burdigalian is at the first appearance of foram species Globigerinoides altiaperturus and the top of magnetic chronozone C6An. , an official GSSP for the Burdigalian had not yet been assigned.

The top of the Burdigalian (the base of the Langhian) is defined by the first appearance of foram species Praeorbulina glomerosa and is also coeval with the top of magnetic chronozone C5Cn.1n.

Paleontology
Famous Burdigalian palaeontologic localities include the Turritellenplatte of Ermingen in Germany and the Dominican amber deposits of Hispaniola.

Possible human evolutionary ancestors such as Victoriapithecus evolved during this time interval.

References

Footnotes

Literature

; 1892: Note sur la classification et le parallélisme du Système miocène, Bulletin de la Société Géologique de France 3(20), p. CXLV-CLVI. 
; 2004: A Geologic Time Scale 2004, Cambridge University Press.

External links

GeoWhen Database - Burdigalian
Neogene timescale, at the website of the subcommission for stratigraphic information of the ICS
 Neogene timescale at the website of the Norwegian network of offshore records of geology and stratigraphy

 
02
 
Miocene geochronology
Geological ages